Till Lindemann (born 4 January 1963) is a German singer, songwriter and poet. He is best known as the lead vocalist and lyricist of Neue Deutsche Härte band Rammstein and solo project Lindemann. Rammstein has sold over 25 million records worldwide, with five of their albums receiving platinum status, and Lindemann has been listed among the "50 Greatest Metal Frontmen of All Time" by Roadrunner Records. He has appeared in minor roles in films and has also published three books of poetry (see below). He has presented some of his original poems and scripts to galleries.

Early life
Lindemann was born on 4 January 1963 in Leipzig (then in East Germany), the son of Norddeutscher Rundfunk (NDR) journalist Brigitte Hildegard "Gitta" Lindemann and poet Werner Lindemann. His parents first met at a conference in Bitterfeld in 1959. He grew up in Wendisch-Rambow alongside his younger sister, Saskia. At age 11, Lindemann went to a sports school at the sports club SC Empor Rostock, and attended a boarding school from 1977 to 1980. His parents lived separately for career reasons after 1975, and divorced when Lindemann was still young. He lived with his father for a short time, but the relationship was unhealthy; in the book Mike Oldfield im Schaukelstuhl, his father wrote about his own problems with alcoholism and the difficulties of being a father to a teenage Lindemann.

According to Lindemann, "I never liked the sport school actually, it was very intense. But as a child you don't object." He later worked as an apprentice carpenter, a gallery technician, a peat cutter, and a basket weaver. His mother dedicated a letter titled Mein Sohn, der Frontmann von Rammstein ("My son, the frontman of Rammstein") to Lindemann in 2009. The first album he owned was Deep Purple's Stormbringer.

Career

Music

Lindemann started to play drums for Schwerin-based experimental rock band First Arsch in 1986, who released an album titled Saddle Up in 1992, and played one song ("Lied von der unruhevollen Jugend") with a punk band called Feeling B, which was the former band of Rammstein members Paul Landers, Christoph Schneider and Christian "Flake" Lorenz in 1989. During his time in Feeling B, he played the drums in the band. In the 1990s, Lindemann began to write lyrics. In 1994, the band entered and won a contest in Berlin that allowed them to record a four track demo professionally. When questioned as to why Rammstein was named after the Ramstein air show disaster, he said he viewed images of the incident on television, and that he and the bandmates wanted to make a musical memorial.

Lindemann then moved to Berlin. During Rammstein's early years, because of his use of over-the-top pyrotechnics, Lindemann has burned his ears, hair and arms. Bandmate Christoph Schneider commented, "Till gets burned all the time, but he likes the pain." An incident in September 1996 caused a section of the band's set to burn, and as a result, Lindemann got his certification in pyrotechnics so the band could perform with pyrotechnics more safely than it had previously.

During Rammstein's US tour in June of 1999, Lindemann and his bandmate Christian "Flake" Lorenz were arrested in Worcester, Massachusetts for lewd conduct performed during their song "Bück dich" ("bend over"), which consisted of Lindemann using a liquid squirting dildo and simulating anal sex on Lorenz. Both Lindemann and Lorenz were released the following day after bail was met. This incident did not stop Lindemann from performing in the same manner for future shows outside the United States, particularly in Australia when they performed at the 2011 Big Day Out, but the United States performances of this song were changed into a sadomasochistic theme that did not feature dildos, although this was not the case for all remaining US shows on the tour. For example, on 18 June 1999, "Bück dich" was performed in the same manner at the Roseland Theater in Portland, Oregon. In 1999, the band was blamed for the 1999 Columbine massacre, but they denied their music was a factor. In November 2002, Lindemann's poetry book Messer was published. It consists of 54 poems compiled by Gert Hof, author of the book Rammstein, who was also the band's pyrodesigner for the last seven years. In July 2010, Lindemann, along with Flake, was interviewed by heavy metal anthropologist Sam Dunn for the VH1 Classic series Metal Evolution, on the topic of shock rock.

Lindemann is not a stranger to injury, as he mentioned in Rammstein's early career that he'd gotten burned several times with unprofessionally rigged pyrotechnics. At a performance in Sweden in 2005, he received a knee injury on stage when keyboardist Flake accidentally ran into him while riding a Segway PT. This injury caused several tour dates in Asia to be cancelled.

In 2005, five Rammstein albums received platinum awards and the band also received the "World Sales Awards" for over 10 million sold copies worldwide.

During the filming of the band's music video for "Ich tu dir weh", Lindemann wanted a light put in his mouth to create a visually stunning effect. Bandmate Paul Landers suggested that he use a flesh colored wire and run it along his cheek to shine a light into his mouth from the outside. Lindemann refused, and instead opted to have a surgical incision in his left cheek, so that a light could be fed into his mouth directly, and largely out of sight.

There is a specific performance move of Lindemann's, dubbed "The Till Hammer". This move is where he bends his knees, beats his thigh with a fist in a hammering motion while turning his head from side to side. On occasion, Flake has been seen to parody the move onstage. Unlike most frontmen, Lindemann stated in an interview that he does not like being looked at while on stage, and would wear sunglasses to block out views of the audience.

The main purpose of the band's signature pyrotechnics has also been stated to actually be a tool in taking the audience's attention away from Lindemann, whilst doubling as a spectacle for the audience. Lindemann often opts to just look directly at the mixing booth in the center of the crowd, except when directly interacting with an audience member. In 2011, Roadrunner Records listed Lindemann at number 50 of the 50 greatest metal frontmen of all time. In 2013, Lindemann's second poetry book, In stillen Nächten was published. He commented on the poetry, saying "The vast majority of my poems could have been written a few hundred years earlier."

On his 52nd birthday (4 January 2015), it was announced that Lindemann would start a new project with Peter Tägtgren named Lindemann. The band released their debut album Skills in Pills in June 2015. On 22 November 2019, Lindemann released their second album, F&M.

In 2021, Lindemann performed a Soviet war song Lubimy Gorod (Beloved Town) in Russian – originally sung by Mark Bernes in 1939 – for the Russian movie V2. Escape from Hell (Devyatayev). Till Lindemann was nominated for Best Narrative at the Berlin Music Video Awards 2020 with his music video ''Frau & Mann''. In 2021, his music video ''Alle Tage ist kein Sonntag'' received a nomination for Most Bizarre.

Poetry

In 2018, Lindemann embarked on a book signing tour across Russia for his poetry book, Messer, originally released in German and then translated into Russian and re-released to the Russian market. Lindemann showed up to his book signing in Moscow with an unknown person in a gimp costume. The female gimp was led through the crowd by Lindemann before he sat down to sign autographs and talk to fans. It is still unknown who was in the outfit, but suggestions are that of his girlfriend at the time.

Film and television

Two songs from the album Herzeleid were used in David Lynch's 1997 film, Lost Highway. Lindemann has also played minor roles in some films, appearing with his bandmate Christoph Schneider as musicians in the 1999 film Pola X, playing a character named Viktor in the children's comedy film Amundsen der Pinguin (2003), and also appearing as an animal rights activist in the 2004 film Vinzent. Lindemann and the rest of Rammstein also appeared in the 2002 movie xXx (Triple-X starring Vin Diesel) while performing "Feuer frei!"

As guest artist
Lindemann appeared as guest drummer on Hea Hoa Hoa Hea Hea Hoa by Feeling B, for the song "Lied von der unruhevollen Jugend"; the song, despite its German title, is sung in Russian. Years later, this track was performed live at a Rammstein gig in St. Petersburg, Russia, on 19 November 2001, during the Mutter tour.
Lindemann provides vocals for the track "Helden" (a German language cover of Bowie's "Heroes") on the Apocalyptica album Worlds Collide.
Lindemann also sings on "Wut will nicht sterben" by Die Puhdys.
Lindemann and Richard Kruspe covered the Aria song "Shtil", retitling it "Schtiel".
Lindemann also appeared on Knorkator's music video to the song "Du nich".
Lindemann once again appeared with Kruspe, this time with Kruspe's band Emigrate, recording guest vocals on the song "Let's Go", on their third album, A Million Degrees.
Lindemann featured on Zaz's fifth album, Isa, providing guest vocals on the song "Le jardin des larmes".
Lindemann appeared again with Kruspe's band Emigrate, recording guest vocals on the song "Always On My Mind" on the band's fourth album THE PERSISTENCE OF MEMORY
Lindemann also appears on the song "Child of Sin" by Kovacs (2023).

Musicianship

Lindemann's vocal range is that of a dramatic baritone. He has a tendency to press his voice with force from below and use the alveolar trill, stating in an interview that he sings it out of instinct. However, this trait could be connected to his youth years in Mecklenburg. In 2005, the New York Times commented on Lindemann's voice: "He commands a low, powerful bass rarely used in contemporary pop music, untrained but electrifying."

Lindemann himself describes his lyrics as "love songs". Some songs written by him have references to 19th century or earlier literature. For example, "Dalai Lama" from the album Reise, Reise is an adaption of Goethe's "Der Erlkönig". He also used more of Goethe's poems, as "Rosenrot" contains elements from the poem "Heidenröslein", while "Feuer und Wasser" has narrative elements from Friedrich Schiller's "Der Taucher". Lindemann also used elements from Der Struwwelpeter by Heinrich Hoffmann on "Hilf mir" from the album Rosenrot. "Mein Herz brennt" has lyrics taken from a narrative line in the East German children's show Das Sandmännchen.

Lindemann has used contemporary literature for intertextual references; the song title "Non, je ne regrette rien" was used as a chorus for the song "Frühling in Paris", and the song lyrics of "Links 2-3-4" are based on the song "Einheitsfrontlied" by Bertolt Brecht. According to Lindemann, the lyrics of the song state the band's political category, positioning themselves on the left. He had also used another song composed by Brecht, titled "Mack the Knife", and the chorus was used for the song "Haifisch".

The song "Cowboy" is a criticism of the hypermasculine character of Americans. Despite "Hollywood propaganda", Lindemann states that it was actually the cowboys who beat up the Native Americans.

Personal life

Lindemann's daughter Nele was born in 1985, and he spent the first seven years of her life as a single father. He has one grandson through Nele. On 28 February 1991, his ex-wife and his Rammstein bandmate Richard Kruspe had a daughter together named Khira, who shares her surname with Lindemann rather than Kruspe as her mother retained the surname when they divorced and never married Kruspe. Lindemann's second daughter, Marie Louise, was born in 1993 to ex-wife Anja Köseling. He dated actress and model Sophia Thomalla from April 2011 to November 2015.

Lindemann is an atheist. In a 2011 interview, he said that he still has strong connections to the traditions of East Germany, and that he finds "de-traditionalisation" disturbing and believes there is "no longer any authenticity". He has said he "hates noise" and often spends time in a small village somewhere in Mecklenburg-Vorpommern, the name of which he has not disclosed.

In 2014, Lindemann presented two sculptures and his original scripts of poems in his book In stillen Nächten (In Silent Nights) in a Dresden gallery. He also wrote some lyrics in 2014 for German Schlager singer Roland Kaiser for his album Soul Tracks.

Discography

Rammstein

 Herzeleid (1995)
 Sehnsucht (1997)
 Mutter (2001)
 Reise, Reise (2004)
 Rosenrot (2005)
 Liebe ist für alle da (2009)
 Rammstein (2019)
 Zeit (2022)

Lindemann
 Skills in Pills (2015)
F & M (2019)

First Arsch
Saddle Up (1992)

Na Chui
Till the End (2020)

As a solo artist
Alle Tage ist kein Sonntag (with David Garrett) (2020)
Любимый город (Lubimiy gorod, Beloved Town) (2021), performed in Russian
Ich hasse Kinder (2021)

As a guest artist
 Lindemann appeared as a guest – drummer on the album Hea Hoa Hoa Hea Hea Hoa by Feeling B for the song "Lied von der unruhevollen Jugend", which is in Russian. The song was played at a Rammstein concert in St. Petersburg on 19 November (2001) during the Mutter tour.
 Lindemann provided vocals for the track Helden (a cover version of Bowies Heroes) on the Apocalyptica album Worlds Collide
 Lindemann also sings the song "Wut Will Nicht Sterben" by Puhdys.
 Lindemann and Richard Z. Kruspe covered the Aria song Shtil and released it as Schtiel Schtiel (Aria Cover) (2003).
 Lindemann has also appeared on Knorkator's music video Du nich.
 Lindemann also sings on some songs with Richard Z. Kruspe, the songs Let's Go and Always On My Mind by Emigrate.
 Lindemann also sings a song with Zaz, the song Le Jardin Des Larmes (2021).
 Lindemann also appears on the song "Child of Sin" by Kovacs (2023).

Poetry

References

External links

Official Rammstein website

1963 births
Living people
20th-century German male singers
German heavy metal singers
20th-century German male actors
20th-century German poets
German male poets
21st-century German male actors
21st-century German male singers
21st-century German poets
21st-century German male writers
German male film actors
German singer-songwriters
German industrial musicians
Musicians from Leipzig
Writers from Leipzig
People from Bezirk Schwerin
Rammstein members
German basses
German drummers
Male drummers
German carpenters
German male swimmers
German atheists
Special effects people
German operatic baritones
German anti-fascists
Industrial metal musicians
20th-century German male writers
People from Nordwestmecklenburg